For You is the thirteenth studio album by American singer Freddie Jackson. It was released by eOne Music on November 16, 2010. His debut with the label, it reached number 48 on the US Top R&B/Hip-Hop Albums chart.

Critical reception

In his review for AllMusic, editor Andy Kellman felt that "at times, there is too much of an evidently conscious effort – both sonically and lyrically – to make Jackson sound current. The best moments come during the slower, more sensitive songs, when Jackson is not attempting to keep up with the times. Complemental and background vocalists are so prominent that the album, at times, does not sound like a Freddie Jackson release at all. There just might be enough of him here to satisfy longtime fans who have been waiting six years for new material." Melody Charles from SoulTracks found that "Jackson's latest is a worthy collection of grown-folks' soul that will resonate with his back-in-the-day followers and might even pick up some new ones."

Track listing
All tracks produced by Barry Eastmond.

Charts

References 

2010 albums
Freddie Jackson albums